Phaonia picealis is a species of fly in the family Muscidae.

Distribution
United States.

References

Muscidae
Insects described in 1965
Diptera of North America